Fig is the sweet edible fruit of Ficus carica, small tree cultivated in temperate areas

Fig, figs, or variants, may also refer to:
 Ficus, a genus of about 850 species of tropical shrubs and trees

Arts and entertainment
 Feminist Improvising Group, an English jazz and experimental music ensemble

Businesses and organisations
 Fig (company), a crowdfunding platform
 Figs (company), an American clothing company
 Fortress Investment Group, an American investment management firm
 International Federation of Surveyors (Fédération Internationale des Géomètres, FIG)
 International Gymnastics Federation (Fédération Internationale de Gymnastique, FIG)

People
 Anton Fig (born 1952), South African drummer 
 David Fig, South African environmental sociologist, political economist, and activist
 Henrik Fig (born 1972), Danish footballer

Places
 Fig, North Carolina, U.S.
 Fria Airport, Guinea, IATA code FIG

Other uses
 Fig., the standard botanical author abbreviation for Antonio Bey Figari (1804–1870)

See also

 Fig Tree (disambiguation)
 Figure (disambiguation)
 Indian Fig (disambiguation)
 At-Tin ('The Fig'), the ninety-fifth sura of the Qur'an
 Fig leaf, a metaphorical term
 Fig Rig, a camera stabilization device for smaller cameras
 Fig sign, a hand gesture 
 Figging, a sexual practice of inserting a piece of ginger root into the anus or vagina
 Xfig, a free and open-source vector graphics editor